Early parliamentary elections were held in Jordan on 23 January 2013. All 150 seats in the House of Representatives were up for election. Voter turnout was reported to be 56.6%.

Election results
Of the 150 available seats, 15 seats were reserved for women, 9 for Christians, 9 for Bedouins, 3 for Chechen or Circassian candidates. A further 27 seats were chosen on the national level, rather than on a constituency basis. The final results of the elections were available on 28 January 2013. More than 90 of the 150 chosen Representatives were new to the House of Representatives. It was reported that a total of 37 Representatives can be seen as Islamist or critical of the government.

Ajloun Governorate 
Ajloun Governorate (2 Districts, 4 Seats)

First District

Second District

Amman Governorate 
Amman Governorate (7 Districts, 25 Seats)

First District

Second District

Third District

Fourth District

Fifth District

Sixth District

Seventh District

Aqaba Governorate
Aqaba Governorate (1 Districts, 2 Seats)

First District

Balqa Governorate
Balqa Governorate ( 4 Districts, 10 Seats)

First District

Second District

Third District

Fourth District

Irbid Governorate
Irbid Governorate (9 Districts, 16 Seats)

First District

Second District

Third District

Fourth District

Fifth District

Sixth District

Seventh District

Eighth District

Ninth District

Jerash Governorate
Jerash Governorate (1 District, 4 Seats)

First District

Karak Governorate
Karak Governorate (6 Districts, 10 Seats)

First District

Second District

Third District

Fourth District

Fifth District

Sixth District

Ma'an Governorate
Ma'an Governorate (3 Districts, 4 Seats)

First District

Second District

Third District

Madaba Governorate
Madaba Governorate (2 Districts, 4 Seats)

First District

Second District

Mafraq Governorate
Mafraq Governorate (1 District, 4 Seats)

First District

Tafilah Governorate
Tafilah Governorate (2 Districts, 4 Seats)

First District

Second District

Zarqa Governorate
Zarqa Governorate (5 Districts, 11 Seats)

First District

Second District

Third District

Fourth District

Northern Badia
Northern Badia ( 3 Seats)

Central Badia
Central Badia ( 3 Seats)

Southern Badia
Southern Badia ( 3 Seats)

Women's Quota
Women's Quota (15 Seats, 1 woman per previous constituency)

National List
National List (the following candidates were chosen as part of a national list rather than a constituency or quota)

See also
 2013 Jordanian general election
 Jordanian parliamentary election results, 2007

References

Literature
 

Elections in Jordan
2013 elections in Asia
2013 in Jordan
2013